The 2019 Pan American Games, officially the XVIII Pan American Games and commonly known as the Lima 2019 Pan-Am Games or Lima 2019, were a multi-sport event governed by the Panam Sports Organization, were held in Lima, Peru from July 26 to August 11, 2019, with preliminary rounds in certain events having begun on July 24, 2019. These were the first Pan American Games to be held in Peru, and the seventh to be held in South America.

The opening ceremony took place on July 26 at the National Stadium, and the Games were declared open by former Peruvian President Martín Vizcarra. These Pan American Games were held at venues in and around Lima, and are the largest sporting event ever hosted by the country.

Bidding process

A total of four bids were submitted for the 2019 Pan American Games, and they were officially announced on February 1, 2013. These were Lima in Peru, Santiago in Chile, Ciudad Bolívar in Venezuela and La Punta in Argentina. Lima bid for the games for the second consecutive time after losing to Toronto for the 2015 edition of the games. Santiago had won the rights to stage the 1975 and 1987 Pan American Games but withdrew both times before hosting. The other two cities bid for the games for the first time. Lima was elected as the host city on October 11, 2013, where PASO members gathered in Toronto, Ontario, Canada to elect the host city. The city was considered the favourite to win the rights to host throughout the contest.

Development and preparation

Venues

The events were held in various Lima districts and neighboring cities, with most of them concentrated in the clusters of VIDENA (a complex in the San Luis District), Pan American Park (Villa María del Triunfo), the Sports Village of Callao, and a sports complex in Costa Verde.

Financing
The total budget is estimated at US$1.2 billion, with $470 million in sports infrastructure, $180 million building the Pan American Village, $430 million spent in organization, and $106 million for other expenses.

Athletes' Village
9,500 athletes and team officials were accommodated in a complex with 1,700 units in Villa El Salvador.

Torch relay

The torch was sent from Mexico to Lima by sailboat, and the torch relay started in Machu Picchu. The torch had toured through 23 cities over 23 days and covered 5,500 kilometers en route to the Peru National Stadium in Lima on July 26, 2019, for the opening ceremony. The cities include Machu Picchu, Ollantaytambo, Cusco, Puno, Lake Titicaca, Arequipa, Camaná, Nazca, Ica, Ayacucho, Huancavelica, Cerro de Pasco, Huánuco, Tocache, Tarapoto, Bagua Grande, Piura, Cajamarca, Trujillo and Huaraz.

The Games

Ceremonies

The opening ceremony of the games took place on July 26, 2019, and the closing ceremony took place on August 11, 2019.

Participating National Olympic Committees
All 41 nations who are members of the Pan American Sports Organization competed at the event. The numbers in parenthesis represents the number of athletes a country qualified.

Number of athletes by National Olympic Committee

Sports
419 events in 38 sports were contested in Lima, the largest number of medal events ever held at a single edition of the Pan American Games. Bodybuilding and surfing were contested at the Pan-Am Games for the first time in 2019, basque pelota was reinstated after being absent from the 2015 Games, and women's baseball was dropped after debuting in 2015.

Almost all of the new events being contested at the 2020 Summer Olympics were already on the Pan-Am Games' program. Sport climbing was excluded because it did not have the required number of national federations in the Americas to be eligible for inclusion. Skateboarding was pulled from the program in May 2019, with Panam Sports citing that World Skate had diminished the quality of the event by having not made the Games be a qualifier for the Olympics, and its partner Street League Skateboarding (SLS) having scheduled a World Tour event in Los Angeles that directly conflicted with the Games.

The new event disciplines introduced for the 2020 Summer Olympics were also added, including the 4 × 100m mixed medley relay, men's 800m and women's 1,500m in swimming, 3-on-3 basketball, BMX freestyle park, two new women's boxing events, madison track cycling, the transfer of three men's events to mixed team events in shooting, table tennis mixed doubles, archery mixed team, and triathlon mixed relay. There was a reduction of one men's weightlifting event, and all canoe events being gender-neutral (removing a men's event from each discipline). At the request of the organizers 19 extra events were added, as were the cases of 1m springboard event was added to diving, as well as compound archery, modern pentathlon relays (with mixed, men's, and women's events), 49er, Nacra 17 and kiteboarding (the latter two replacing the Hobie 16 and J/24) events in sailing, extreme canoe slalom, mixed doubles squash, women's wakeboard, poomsae events in taekwondo, women's 50 km race walking, and doubles table tennis.

Numbers in parentheses indicate the number of medal events to be contested in each sport/discipline.

 Aquatics
 
 
 
 
 
 
 
 
Baseball
 
 
 
 
 
 
 
  
 Canoe sprint (12)
 Canoe slalom (6)
 
 BMX (4)
 Mountain biking (2)
 Road (4)
 Track (12)
 
 Dressage (2)
 Eventing (2)
 Jumping (2)
 
 
 
 
 
 Artistic gymnastics (14)
 Rhythmic gymnastics (8)
 Trampoline (2)
 
 
 
 
 
 
 Figure Skating (2)
 Speed Skating (6)
 
 
 
 
 
 
 
 
 
 
 Volleyball
 
 
 
 
 
 Freestyle (12)
 Greco-Roman (6)

Calendar
The calendar was unveiled on April 18, 2019, 100 days ahead to the start of the competition.

Medal table

Key

Media

Broadcasting

Mediapro served as host broadcaster. The Lima Convention Centre hosted the International Broadcast Centre (IBC). Panam Sports also launched the Panam Sports Channel on its website, which featured supplemental video content from the Games hosted by local personality Alexandra Hörler.

Marketing

Logo
The official logo of the 2019 Pan American Games is inspired by the amancay, an indigenous flower that flourishes from June 24 through September 30. The flower and its pistils represent three athletes with open arms and the three Americas, with the identity of Lima. It was designed by Peruvian graphic designers Juan Diego Sanz and Jorge Luis Zárate.

Mascot
In June 2017, after over a thousand submissions, the organising committee revealed the final three in the running to be the mascot of the games. The final three designs were: Milco, which was influenced by Cuchimilco sculptures (pre-Hispanic figures of Chancay culture developed in Lima around 1200–1470 A.D.); a flower named Amantis; and Wayqi, a leaf-toed gecko. In July 2017, it was announced Milco was the winner of the contest, receiving 45% of the vote. There was approximately 44,154 votes cast in the contest, the most ever for a mascot competition for the Pan American Games. The winning designer of the competition was awarded 15,000 Peruvian sol (or approximately US$4,600). Milco's body is orange and the colour of his shorts is red, while his T-shirt is white, representing the colors of the Peruvian flag. Milco was designed by 24-year-old Andrea Norka Medrano Moy.

See also
 2019 Parapan American Games

References

External links

 
 Schedule and results

2019 Pan American Games
Pan American Games
Pan American Games
2019 in North American sport
2019 in South American sport
2019 in Peruvian sport
2010s in Lima
Pan American Games
Pan American Games
Sports competitions in Lima
Multi-sport events in Peru
International sports competitions hosted by Peru